Ethmia postica is a moth in the family Depressariidae. It occurs in interior areas of Australia, from north-western and south central Western Australia to western Queensland, New South Wales and Victoria.

The forewings are white, with blackish-fuscous markings. The costal edge is blackish, interrupted about one-fourth and near the apex. There is an irregular costal spot near the base and a dorsal dot at one-fourth, an irregular costal spot near the base and a dorsal dot at one-fourth. There is an irregular bar from one-fifth of the costa, reaching three-fourths across the wing and there is a small subdorsal spot before the middle. There is a small triangular spot on the costa at two-fifths, and a dot below it and a small triangular spot on the costa beyond the middle. A transverse S-shaped mark is found beyond the middle towards the dorsum, but not reaching it. A discal dot is found at three-fourths and there is an irregular transverse line from about three-fourths of the costa to the tornus, curved outwards from near the costa to three-fourths, whence a sharp projection proceeds to touch the lower side of the preceding discal dot. There is also a slender streak along the termen. The hindwings are white and thinly scaled with the costa and apical fourth fuscous, darker towards the apex.

References

Moths described in 1877
postica